1982 ACC tournament may refer to:

 1982 ACC men's basketball tournament
 1982 ACC women's basketball tournament
 1982 Atlantic Coast Conference baseball tournament